Luis Entenza (1904 – death unknown) was a Cuban outfielder in the Negro leagues in the 1920s. 

A native of Cienfuegos, Cuba, Entenza made his Negro leagues debut in 1927 with the Cuban Stars (West), and played with the Stars again the following season.

References

External links
 and Seamheads

1904 births
Date of birth missing
Year of death missing
Place of death missing
Cuban Stars (West) players
Baseball outfielders
Cuban baseball players
People from Cienfuegos